Yeshey Gyeltshen (born 11 February 1983) is a Bhutanese international footballer, currently playing for Druk Star. He made his first appearance for the Bhutan national football team in 2009.

Career statistics

International goals

References

1983 births
Bhutanese footballers
Bhutan international footballers
Druk Pol F.C. players
Living people
Association football forwards